Egerton Hall, Manchester was founded as a Theological College in 1908 to train Anglican clergy to serve in the Church of England.It was located in Oxford Place and closed in 1944.

Notes

Educational institutions established in 1908
Educational institutions disestablished in 1944
Anglican seminaries and theological colleges
Former theological colleges in England
Education in Manchester
1908 establishments in England
1944 disestablishments in England